If Songs Could Be Held is the third album by American singer/songwriter Rosie Thomas, released in 2005.

Produced by Busbee, the album features a duet with Ed Harcourt on "Let It Be Me". The album also features Liz Phair, Dino Meneghin, and Josh Myers.

Reception

AllMusic gave the album three and a half stars out of five, with James Christopher Monger calling it "a lovely collection of Sunday morning melancholy that's as gentle as it is weary" and "the most accessible record ever to bear the SubPop insignia". Paste, tinymixtapes, and Punknews.org gave it similar ratings. Pitchfork Media gave it a 5.9 out of 10 rating. PopMatters gave it 6/10, with David Bernard saying it "sounds amazing".

Prefix writer John Zeiss was less complementary, giving the album 3/10 and calling "a letdown".

Track listing
All songs written by Rosie Thomas unless otherwise stated.  All songs arranged by Rosie Thomas and busbee.

 "Since You've Been Around" – 3:18
 "Pretty Dress" (Thomas/busbee) – 3:56
 "Loose Ends" – 3:41
 "It Don't Matter to the Sun" (Gordon Kennedy, Wayne Kirkpatrick, Tommy Sims) – 3:40
 "Guess It May" (Thomas/busbee) – 4:11
 "Let It Be Me" (Gilbert Bécaud, Pierre Leroyer) – 3:40
 "Clear as a Bell" – 3:27
 "Say What You Want" (Thomas/busbee) – 3:44
 "Time Goes Away" (Thomas/busbee) – 3:44
 "Death Came and Got Me" – 2:50
 "Tomorrow" (Thomas/busbee) – 3:19

References

Rosie Thomas (singer-songwriter) albums
2005 albums
Sub Pop albums